Anett Bocsi (born May 9, 1978), known by her stage name Anette Dawn, is a Hungarian call girl, make-up artist, entrepreneur, artist, glamour model, and former pornographic actress. She rose to prominence for her performances in adult films and her work as a glamour model. She made her debut as a porn actress in the film Wild Adventures (2002), produced by Private. Dawn was named Treat of the Month for March 2007 on Twistys.

Early life
Born in Salgótarján, Nógrád, Bocsi began working as a make-up artist, and also worked for Hungarian commercial television, where she had a very irregular job. Back then there was a photoshoot of girls dressed in suggestive clothing, Bocsi, motivated by seeing this, thought about giving it a try, and soon after she became an adult model.

Career
She debuted as a porn actress in 2002 when she appeared for the first time in the film titled "Wild Adventures" by Private company, then posed for other sites on the Internet and made a lot of photo sets and web scenes for VivThomas and for the website 21Sextury when it was just launched in 2003, becoming one of the first models of this site.

In 2007 Dawn ranked No. 1 overall in Twistys member voting, ahead of Crissy Moran, Shay Laren, Susana Spears and Erica Campbell.

In 2009 she was nominated for the Twistys Treat of the Year contest, competing along with other pornographic actresses such as Ashlynn Brooke, Jessica Jaymes, Kayden Kross, Heather Vandeven, Louise Glover, among others, for the title and a prize of 10,000 dollars, but the winner was Bree Olson.

Appearances
Anette Dawn has been a cover model for European and US adult magazines, such as Bitches, Ravers, For Men, Hawk, Gallery, Club Confidential, Swank and CKM. She has also been published in Private's magazines as Girls Only, Sex, Triple X, Private and Pirate. She appeared in magazines with exclusive interviews for Paul Raymond Publications as Mayfair, Men's World, Men Only, Just Girls, among others.

She has appeared also in the VirtuaGirl2 software, a virtual program of computer for the Windows desktop, in which she appears like a stripper virtually animated and where it is possible see her doing a striptease along with music from the same program on desktop.

In 2005 she appeared in the film 8mm 2, filmed in Budapest and released the same year, where she made a brief appearance performing a porn actress with Sandy in the scene where there are two naked girls on a photographic set, Anette is one of the two girls on the set.

Filmography

Distinctions and nominations
 Twistys Treat of the Month (March 2007).

In March 2007, Dawn was named Twistys Treat of the Month on Twistys website. Later in 2009, she was nominated for the Twistys Treat of the Year contest.

See also
 List of pornographic actors who appeared in mainstream films
 Prostitution in Hungary

References

External links
 
 
 
 
 

1978 births
21st-century Hungarian actresses
21st-century Hungarian women artists
Actresses from Budapest
Escorts
Glamour models
Hungarian female adult models
Hungarian film actresses
Hungarian pornographic film actresses
Hungarian prostitutes
Hungarian women ceramists
Living people
Make-up artists
People from Salgótarján